Clarkson Crolius (bapt. October 30, 1774 – October 3, 1843) was an American businessman and politician.

Life

Born in New York City, Colony of New York, Clarkson Crolius was the son of Johannes (John) Crolius and Maria Clarkson Crolius. His grandfather Johan Willem (William) Crolius, a manufacturer of stoneware, is said to have come from Germany to New York, and ran a pottery on Reade Street, near Broadway.

In 1811, as Grand Sachem of the Tammany Society, he laid the foundation stone of the old Tammany Hall in Frankfort Street.

At the beginning of the War of 1812, he was a major in the Twenty-seventh Regiment of the State Militia, but resigned his commission and received an appointment to the same rank in the regular service. He finished the war as a colonel.

He was an alderman of New York City for many years. He was a member from New York County of the New York State Assembly in 1806, 1807, from 1816 to 1822, in 1824 and 1825, and was Speaker in 1825.

In 1830, he was one of the incorporators of the Canajoharie and Catskill Railroad.

In 1831, he was the leader of the National Republican Party in New York City.

He married  Elizabeth Meyer (c. 1774–1856). Their son, State Senator Clarkson Crolius (born 1801), discontinued the manufacture of stoneware in Bayard Street in 1845, and the pottery was afterwards demolished.

He died at his home in New York City on October 3, 1843.

References

Sources

History of the NY Fire Department
Art Inventory
Early Railroad history
Google Books The New York Civil List compiled by Franklin B. Hough (Weed, Parsons & Co., Albany NY, 1858)

1774 births
1843 deaths
American people of German descent
American colonial people
People of the Province of New York
Members of the New York State Assembly
Speakers of the New York State Assembly
19th-century American railroad executives